Alucita tesserata is a species of moth of the family Alucitidae. It is known from South Africa.

References

Endemic moths of South Africa
Alucitidae
Moths described in 1918
Moths of Africa
Taxa named by Edward Meyrick